Nicholas Friton (died 1597) was a Roman Catholic prelate who served as Archbishop of Nakhchivan (1560–1597).

Biography
On 20 October 1560, Nicholas Friton was appointed during the papacy of Pope Pius IV as Archbishop of Nakhchivan. He served as Archbishop of Nakhchivan until his death in 1597.

References 

16th-century Roman Catholic bishops in the Ottoman Empire
Bishops appointed by Pope Pius IV
1597 deaths